"Back on Top" is a song written by Northern Irish singer-songwriter Van Morrison and the title track on his 1999 album, Back on Top.  It was released as a single in the UK and charted at number sixty-nine.

Recording and composition
"Back on Top" was recorded in 1998 at Wool Hall Studios in Beckington, with Walter Samuel as engineer.

It has a happy upbeat melody and the optimistic lyrics may be about being successful in personal relationships as well as professionally successful.  
"Always strivin', always climbing way beyond my will"
"It's the same old sensation, isolation at the top of the hill"

The Allmusic review for the album, says that "'Back on Top', the title track, swings along with such ease that you're tempted to check and make sure you didn't put in Moondance by mistake."

In his live concerts, Morrison has often entered on stage playing harmonica as the band starts up this song.

Appearance on other albums
A live performance version from Morrison's appearance at the Austin City Limits Festival on 15 September 2006 was included on the limited edition album, Live at Austin City Limits Festival. It was included on the 2007 compilation album, The Best of Van Morrison Volume 3 and also on the 2007 compilation album, Still on Top - The Greatest Hits.

Personnel
Van Morrison – vocals, harmonica
Fiachra Trench – piano
Geraint Watkins – Hammond organ
Mick Green – electric and acoustic guitars
Ian Jennings – double bass
Bobby Irwin – drums
Pee Wee Ellis – tenor saxophone
Brian Kennedy – backing vocals

Notes

References
Heylin, Clinton (2003). Can You Feel the Silence?, Chicago Review Press 

1999 singles
Van Morrison songs
Songs written by Van Morrison
1988 songs
Polydor Records singles
Song recordings produced by Van Morrison